Chromium(II) oxide (CrO) is an inorganic compound composed of chromium and oxygen. It is a black powder that crystallises in the rock salt structure.
Hypophosphites may reduce chromium(III) oxide to chromium(II) oxide:

H3PO2 + 2 Cr2O3 → 4 CrO + H3PO4

It is readily oxidized by the atmosphere.

CrO occurs in the spectra of luminous red novae, which occur when two stars collide. It is not known why red novae are the only objects that feature this molecule; one possible explanation is an as-yet-unknown nucleosynthesis process.

See also
 Chromium(IV) oxide
 Chromium(VI) oxide

References

Chromium(II) compounds
Transition metal oxides
Reducing agents
Chromium–oxygen compounds
Rock salt crystal structure